

National

National Basketball League

Women's National Basketball League

State
NBL1
See List of NBL1 clubs

See also

Basketball in Australia
List of Australian rules football clubs in Australia
List of cricket clubs in Australia
List of baseball teams in Australia
List of rowing clubs in Australia
List of rugby league clubs in Australia
List of rugby union clubs in Australia
List of yacht clubs in Australia

External links

 
Basketball
Clubs